Ochrosia kilaueaensis is an extinct species of flowering plant in the genus Ochrosia in Apocynaceae. Its common names include holei and Hawaii yellowwood. It was endemic to the island of Hawaii. It has been collected only at Puuwaawaa and Kipuka Puaulu and has not been seen since the 1940s.

References

External links
USDA Plants Profile

Trees of Hawaii
Endemic flora of Hawaii
kilaueaensis
Extinct plants
Taxonomy articles created by Polbot

Extinct flora of Hawaii